Assembly of Representatives may refer to:

Assembly of Representatives (Mandatory Palestine), the parliament of the Jewish community in Mandatory Palestine 1920–1949
Assembly of Representatives (Morocco), the elected lower house of the Parliament of Morocco.
Assembly of Representatives (Tajikistan), the elected lower house of the Supreme Assembly of Tajikistan
Assembly of Representatives (Yemen), or House of Representatives, the elected lower house of the Parliament of Yemen

See also
House of Representatives
Representative Assembly of French India, 1946–1955